Andreas Jens Krogh (9 July 1894 – 26 April 1964) was a Norwegian figure skater. He won the silver medal at the 1920 Summer Olympics.

Results

Men's singles

Pairs
(with Astrid Nordsveen)

References

External links
 Database Olympics

Navigation

1894 births
Norwegian male single skaters
Norwegian male pair skaters
Olympic figure skaters of Norway
Figure skaters at the 1920 Summer Olympics
Olympic silver medalists for Norway
Olympic medalists in figure skating
1964 deaths
Medalists at the 1920 Summer Olympics
Sportspeople from Oslo